The Hongqi LS7 is an upcoming full-size luxury SUV produced by Chinese luxury automobile manufacturer Hongqi, a subsidiary of FAW Group.

Overview

The Hongqi LS7 was officially revealed online on 25 October 2021, as the largest SUV by a Chinese manufacturer and a direct competitor to domestic full-size SUVs such as the BAIC BJ90 and foreign import models including the Cadillac Escalade, Lincoln Navigator, and Mercedes-Benz GLS-Class.

Specifications

See also
 Hongqi E-HS9, another full-size luxury SUV produced by Hongqi

References

Cars of China
Luxury sport utility vehicles
LS7
Flagship vehicles
Full-size vehicles
All-wheel-drive vehicles
Cars introduced in 2022